Toby Joseph Price OAM is an Australian off-road and enduro motorcycle racing world champion.  He lives in Gold Coast, Queensland, and rode for the KTM Off-Road Racing Team until October 2015. He now represents the Red Bull Factory KTM Rally Team.

Price is a two-time winner of the Dakar Rally, taking out the Bikes class in 2016 and 2019.

Amateur career 
Raised in a family that loves motorsports, he started riding motorbikes aged 2 years and started winning races at four. His father, John Price, is a former off-road buggy Australian champion. As a junior, living in Roto and then Hillston, Price frequently won New South Wales and Australian junior titles from around 1994 to 2003.

In 2003, Price won both of the two top divisions in the Australian Junior Motocross Championships, the 15 Years 125cc class and the 13–16 years 250cc 4-stroke, 12 weeks after breaking both wrists in a training accident.

Professional career

2004–2008
Price began his professional career in Australia in 2004, aged 16. After winning two Australian junior titles in 2003 he was signed by Kawasaki Australia and then moved from Hillston to Singleton. Injuries kept him from competing for much of this time.

2009
Riding for Kawasaki, he won the Australian Off-Road Championship in his first year of competition. He was awarded the Australian Dirt Bike magazine Rookie of the Year title.

Chosen to ride for Australia in the 2009 Enduro in Portugal, Price was the fastest under-23 years rider and was 14th in the world.

2010
Riding for KTM, Price won most of the major Australian Off-Road titles of 2010: AORC, Finke (on first attempt), Hattah (on first attempt), A4DE.

2011
Except for a fuel mishap in round one of the 2011 AORC, and a mechanical failure in the Finke Desert Race, Price again won most of the major off-road races in Australia. He won rounds 2, 3 and 4 of the AORC, Hattah and the A4DE.
A mid-season injury put him out of the AORC title chase, leaving him in ninth place overall.

Selected for the Australian team to compete in the 2011 International Six Days Enduro (ISDE) competition in Finland from 8 to 13 August, Price finished fourth in the E2 class of the ISDE and eighth overall, making him the highest finishing Australian.

2012
Price took first place Pro Class Melbourne Enduro-X and won the Finke Desert Race and Hattah Desert Race He also won AORC, the first time it had been won from the E3 class, winning eight of the ten rounds, and finishing second in the other two.

He was selected for the Australian team to compete in the 2012 International Six Days Enduro competition in Germany from 24 to 29 September, leading the Australian team to second place in the world. After the first couple of days, Price was leading the E3 class and was fifth overall, despite a bent front wheel from the first day. Near the halfway mark of the event, he suffered broken ribs in an incident. He continued despite the injuries, finishing second in the E3 class and tenth overall.

Two weeks after returning from the ISDE, Price won the E3 class in the A4DE, coming second overall, still riding with broken ribs.

2013
Riding for KTM, Price won rounds 2, 3 and 4 of the AORC, leading the E3 class and Outright.

While in California riding for KTM America in the AMA Hare and Hound National Championship in April, Price was involved in a crash, breaking three bones in his neck, and his thumb. After a major operation to repair his neck, Price was unable to ride until September. Following intensive rehabilitation, he returned to America and joined the KTM America team (though not riding) for the November Baja 1000 in which his teammate Kurt Caselli was killed.

Price's first major race after the broken neck was the December Red Bull Day In The Dirt in California, where he came second.

2014
Price won round 1 of the AORC, but suffered a crash that put him out of round 2. Less than a month later, still suffering the effects of the crash, he came second in rounds 3 and 4. He placed first in rounds 5, 6, 9, 10 and 11, becoming the only rider to win the AORC four times.

In June, he won the Finke Desert race for the third time, followed by the Hattah Desert Race again in July.

He won all three rounds of the Western Australian Desert Tri-Series, the Kumarina 500 in June, Doorawarrah 500 in July and Indee 500 in August.

Trying International Cross-country Rallying for the first time, Price showed his versatility by gaining 8th place in the Morocco Rally.

In November, he won the E3 class at the International Six Days Enduro (ISDE) in Argentina, coming second overall by 45 seconds, after 6 days' racing.

Returning to California for the Red Bull Day In The Dirt, Price took out first place for 2014.

2015
In his debut attempt at the Dakar Rally, Price achieved a win in Stage 12, and finished in third place overall.

Price was a guest driver at the Clipsal 500 Stadium Super Trucks race at Adelaide Street Circuit. He competed in two of the three races, finishing sixth and eighth.

Several days before the 2015 Finke Desert Race, a large stick penetrated Price's boot while practising, breaking his right ankle and foot. He continued, and qualified first in the prologue, then won both days of the race, taking out his fourth Finke title.

Price won his fifth Hattah Desert Race title in July, coinciding with signing to replace the retiring Marc Coma on the Factory KTM Red Bull Rally team in the World Rally Championship and Dakar Rally

He then took out a record fifth AORC win, wrapping up the title with two rounds still remaining.

2016
In January, Price dominated the Dakar Rally, winning Stages 2,5,6,8 and 9, winning overall by about 40 minutes, and becoming the first Australian to ever win any class of the Dakar Rally, as well as the only person to ever win on the second attempt and the first non-European to win the Bikes category.

He followed this up in April by becoming the first Australian ever to win the Abu Dhabi Desert Challenge, putting him in the lead of the 2016 World Championship.

Price returned to Australia for the 2016 Finke Desert Race, competing in both Cars and Bikes, flying back along the track by aircraft after completing the Car leg each day, then riding the Bike leg. He came second in the Cars, then won the Bikes for a record-equalling fifth time.

In October, Price returned to Europe, winning the OiLibya Rally in Morocco, and taking 3rd place overall in the 2016 World Championship.

2017
Price started his 2017 season with the Dakar once again, however he crashed out of the race while leading in Stage 4, having won Stage 2. He was later diagnosed with a broken left femur.

Eight weeks after breaking his femur, Price was back in the driver's seat at the Adelaide Clipsal 500 in the Stadium Super Trucks. He came fourth in Race 1 and second in Race 2.

Price was unable to race in the bikes section of the 2017 Finke Desert Race on doctor's orders, but was able to compete in the buggies. Starting from 7th on the grid in dusty conditions, Price was in 3rd place 80 km from the finish when his car broke down with an engine sensor failure.

2018
Price’s first motorcycle race since breaking his femur was the 2018 Dakar Rally in January. He rode consistently for the first 9 stages, but was in a group of riders who took a wrong turn in Stage 10, losing about 50 minutes.
He then won Stages 11 and 13, coming third overall by 23 minutes.

In March, he returned to the Adelaide 500, driving in both the Stadium Super Trucks and the new SuperUtes Series. He came second overall in the inaugural round of the SuperUtes. Price had troubles in the first two rounds of the Stadium Super Trucks, but finished Race 3 in 3rd place.

He then raced in the Abu Dhabi Desert Challenge, winning the first stage. Price finished seventh overall, after a big crash in Stage 2, and stopping to assist fellow rider Mohammed Balooshi who was unconscious after a crash in Stage 3.

Toby returned to Australia for the 2018 Finke Desert Race, again attempting the Iron Man Double (Car and Bike titles). After Day 1 he was coming second in the Cars, but had a power steering pump failure and did not complete the return leg. He led the Bikes all the way on both days, despite a hard fall around the 100 km mark on Day 2. He finished over 10 minutes ahead of his nearest rival, taking out a record 6th Bikes title.

In August, Price came second in the 2018 Atacama Rally in Chile, then second by 6 seconds in the Desafío Ruta 40 in Tucumán, Argentina.

He won the final round of the FIM Cross-Country Rallies World Championship, the Rallye OiLibya du Maroc, in October, becoming 2018 FIM World Rally Champion. Price was the first Australian to ever achieve this title.

2019
Riding with a broken wrist, Price won the 2019 Dakar Rally.
He was awarded the inaugural Ronald J Walker Award for Excellence by the Australian Motor Sport Hall of Fame in March.

In October, Price returned to the Stadium Super Trucks for the Gold Coast 600 weekend. Although he did not have a qualifying time when his No. 87 truck began experiencing oil pressure problems, he set the fastest unofficial time when he briefly drove Robby Gordon's No. 7 truck. In the first race of the weekend, Price started on the pole and led every lap until he was turned by Matthew Brabham in turn 11 on the final lap, dropping him to sixth. He finished the second race in fifth.

Price also raced in the Baja 1000 along with Nasser Al-Attiyah coming in second place.

2020
Price came third in the 2020 Dakar Rally, winning Stages 1 and 5.
In Stage 7, he was first on scene and stopped for an hour and 20 minutes to try to assist Paulo Gonçalves, who was later pronounced dead from injuries sustained in the crash. Stage 8 of the rally was cancelled for the motorbikes and quads following the death of Paulo.

In February, Price returned to the Stadium Super Trucks at Adelaide, racing under the Team Australia banner in a crossover race between SST and the newly-formed Australian Boost Mobile Super Trucks.

2021
Price won Stages 1 and 3 of the 2021 Dakar Rally, and rode all Stage 8 with a severely damaged rear tyre that he repaired with duct tape and cable ties. He was less than a minute from the overall lead in Stage 9 when he crashed, injuring his left arm and shoulder and had to be airlifted to hospital, putting him out of the race.

In June, Price became the first person to win the Finke Desert Race both in a car and on a bike, when he won the Cars category. Four days before Finke, he re-signed with KTM Factory Racing for another two years, and received doctor's clearance to ride motorcycles again following his Dakar shoulder injury.

Price returned to the Boost Mobile Super Trucks in July at Reid Park Street Circuit. He won his first career SST race in the first event after taking the lead following the competition caution.

2022
Price came 10th in the 2022 Dakar Rally, winning Stage 10.

His autobiography, Endurance: The Toby Price Story was released in late January.

Returning to the Finke Desert Race in June, Price won the Cars category for the second time, setting a record time of 1:36:38 from Alice Springs to Finke, and an overall race record of 3:21:46. This gave Price his eighth King of the Desert title and he remains the only competitor to have won on both two wheels and four.

2023
Price came second in the 2023 Dakar Rally, after winning the Prologue. He was 43 seconds behind teammate Kevin Benavides after 2 weeks of racing.

Sponsorships

 KTM (2009–present)
 Red Bull
 Lancaster Motor Group
 Mitsubishi Motors
 ARB 4x4 Accessories
 Can-Am
 Blundstone Footwear, BFGoodrich
 Michelin, Santa Cruz Bicycles, Oakley, Inc.
 Method Race Wheels
 Battery World, Yuasa Batteries
 Gearwrench, Milwaukee
 TSCO Racing, Fox Racing Shox, MoTeC
 Sparco, CBR, SDG, Howe Performance
 Fiberwerx, Waverley Fork Lifts, Rigid
 Supercheap Auto
 Kawasaki motorcycles (2003–2009)

Career results

Major titles

2009 Australian Off-Road Championship (AORC)
2010 Finke Desert Race
2010 Hattah Desert Race
2010 Australian 4 Day Enduro (A4DE)
2010 Australian Off-Road Championship (AORC)
2011 Hattah Desert Race
2011 Australian 4 Day Enduro (A4DE)
2012 Finke Desert Race
2012 Hattah Desert Race
2012 Australian Off-Road Championship (AORC)
2014 Finke Desert Race
2014 Hattah Desert Race
2014 Australian Off-Road Championship (AORC)
2014 International Six Days Enduro (ISDE) E3
2014 A Day in the Dirt Motocross Grand Prix
2015 Finke Desert Race
2015 Hattah Desert Race
2015 Australian Off-Road Championship (AORC)
2016 Dakar Rally
2016 Abu Dhabi Desert Challenge
2016 Finke Desert Race
2016 Rallye OiLibya du Maroc
2018 Finke Desert Race
2018 Rallye OiLibya du Maroc
2018 FIM Cross-Country Rallies World Championship
2019 Dakar Rally
2021 Finke Desert Race (Cars)
2022 Finke Desert Race (Cars)

Dakar Rally

Stadium Super Trucks
(key) (Bold – Pole position. Italics – Fastest qualifier. * – Most laps led.)

Boost Mobile Super Trucks
(key) (Bold – Pole position. Italics – Fastest qualifier. * – Most laps led.)

 Standings were not recorded by the series for the 2020 season.

FIM Cross-Country Rallies World Championship
2016 3rd place
2018 1st place

Awards
Price was awarded the Order of Australia Medal for service to motorsport in the 2021 Australia Day Honours List.

References

1987 births
Living people
People from New South Wales
Australian motorcycle racers
Enduro riders
Off-road motorcycle racers
Stadium Super Trucks drivers
Dakar Rally motorcyclists
Dakar Rally winning drivers
Sportspeople from the Gold Coast, Queensland